Legendary is a "best of" album by metalcore band Zao. It was released on December 17, 2003, on Solid State/Tooth & Nail/EMI. It is the eighth album by the group. The last three songs are previously unreleased studio demos with Corey Darst on vocals. "The Icarus Complex" appeared on This is Solid State Vol.3.

Track listing

Credits
Dan Weyandt – vocals
Scott Mellinger – guitar, bass
Russ Cogdell – guitar, bass
Jesse Smith – drums, guitar, vocals
Rob Horner – bass
Brett Detar – guitar, bass
Shawn Jonas – vocals
Roy Goudy – guitar
Mic Cox – bass
Corey Darst – vocals

Quotes
"Zao were quite literally one of the first few heavy bands to truly break out of the Christian underground scene and gain the attention and admiration of secular audiences... From their humbly loose hardcore beginnings to their overpowering metal meets death grind days, all the way to their progressive almost Neurosis like moments, the group have never been afraid to push themselves and 'Legendary' isn't afraid to show it... A fitting tribute to one of the underground's greats." — ThePRP.com

References

Zao (American band) albums
2003 greatest hits albums
Tooth & Nail Records compilation albums
Solid State Records albums